When the Cellar Children See the Light of Day is the second studio album by the Finnish singer-songwriter Mirel Wagner, released worldwide in August 2014 by the American label Sub Pop. In Finland it was released by the indie label Kioski.

The album won the 2014 Nordic Music Prize which is an annual award for the best Nordic album.

Commercial response 
The album peaked #1 in the Finnish Album Chart in August 2014.

Singles 
The single Oak Tree was released in May 2014.

Track listing

References 

2014 albums
Mirel Wagner albums
Sub Pop albums